Tokyo Storm Warning is a three-issue comic book mini-series published in 2003 by WildStorm imprint Cliffhanger. It was written by Warren Ellis, with art by James Raiz and Andrew Currie.

Publication history
Named after an Elvis Costello song, the series was published between August and December of 2003 and later collected into a trade paperback with Red. The book was written during a period in which Ellis' mostly produced books in three-issue bursts for independent DC imprints (like Wildstorm's Homage Comics and Cliffhanger), such as Red and Reload, because he had reached the end of his exclusive contract with DC and was reassessing his next steps.

Plot
The comic takes place in an alternate timeline where after the capture of U-234 on 14 May 1945 and the discovery of its nuclear cargo (intended for the Japanese atomic program in Tokyo) the US decides to use its first A-Bomb on Tokyo to prevent the Japanese developing their own device. Following this Japan finds itself plagued by giant monsters and the appearance of giant battle robots within the city of Tokyo, over the next sixty years.

It followed the exploits of the pilots of the ARCangels - gigantic robotic constructs used by the Japanese government to battle fantastic creatures hell-bent on penetrating the defenses of a secret installation in the heart of modern Tokyo.

Reception
Praised for its depiction of the Japanese, the first issue is considered an English-language homage to Neon Genesis Evangelion.  Tokyo Storm Warning is mostly concerned with the 'giant robot' genre through the perspective of Western readers, which it uses as its main selling point. Several of the creatures depicted also bear a resemblance to famous movie monsters, such as the Americanised Godzilla, and King Ghidorah, while the ARCangels have several surface details similar to robots from the Gundam franchise.

Collected editions
The series was collected into a trade paperback with Red:

Red/Tokyo Storm Warning (144 pages, June 2004)

Notes

References

External links
 Review of Tokyo Storm Warning #2, 2 and 3, Comics Bulletin

2003 comics debuts
2003 comics endings
WildStorm limited series
Comics by Warren Ellis
Kaiju
Mecha comics
Red (franchise)